Cássia dos Coqueiros is a municipality in the state of São Paulo in Brazil. The population is 2,505 (2020 est.) in an area of 192 km². The elevation is 890 m.

References

Municipalities in São Paulo (state)